Tepanjski Vrh is a settlement west of Tepanje in the Municipality of Slovenske Konjice in eastern Slovenia. The area is part of the traditional region of Styria and is now included in the Savinja Statistical Region.

References

External links
Tepanjski Vrh at Geopedia

Populated places in the Municipality of Slovenske Konjice